Manzini is a region of Eswatini (formerly known as Swaziland), located in the center-west of the country. It has an area of 4,093.59 km² and a population of 355,945 (2017). Its administrative center is Manzini.  It borders all three other regions: Hhohho in the north, Lubombo in the east, and Shiselweni in the south. It is bordered by the Mpumalanga province in South Africa to the west.

Administrative divisions
Manzini is subdivided to 16 tinkhundla (or constituencies). These are local administration centres, and also parliamentary constituencies. Each inkhundla is headed by an indvuna yenkhundla or governor with the help of bucopho. The tinkhundla are further divided into imiphakatsi (or chiefdoms). The present tinkhundla are:

 Ekukhanyeni
 Imiphakatsi: Bhekinkhosi, Ebutfonweni, Embheka, Engcayini, Engwazini, Enkiliji, Ensenga, Enyakeni, Esankolweni, Eswaceni, Kantunja, Maliyaduma, Mdayaneni, Mkhulamini
 Hlambanyatsi
 Imiphakatsi: Dingizwe, Lundzi, Mbangave, Mlindazwe, Zondwako
 Kwaluseni
 Imiphakatsi: Kwalusenimhlane, Logoba
 Lamgabhi
 Imiphakatsi: Dudusini, Emhlangeni, Engwenyameni, Kalamgabhi, Kaluhleko
 Lobamba Lomdzala
 Imiphakatsi: Luyengo, Malkerns
 Ludzeludze
 Imiphakatsi: Ekudzeni, Enkamanzi, Esibuyeni, Esigombeni, Mbekelweni, Usweni, Zombodze
 Mafutseni
 Imiphakatsi: Engculwini, Etimbutini, Kabhudla, Kankhambule, Luhlokohla, Mafutseni
 Mahlangatja
 Imiphakatsi: Bhahwini, Ebuseleni, Eludvondvolweni, Eluzelweni, Emambatfweni, Empolonjeni, Kazulu, Mgomfelweni, Nsangwini, Sigcineni
 Mangcongco
 Imiphakatsi: Dwalile, Mafutseni, Mangcongco, Ncabaneni, Sandlane
 Manzini North
 Imiphakatsi: Edwaleni, Emakholweni, Mnyenyweni, Mzimnene
 Manzini South
 Imiphakatsi: Lwandle, Mjingo, Moneni, Zakhele
 Mkhiweni
 Imiphakatsi: Dvokolwako, Ekutsimleni, Mbelebeleni
 Mtfongwaneni
 Imiphakatsi: Bulunga, Ehlane, Gundwini, Lwandle, Ndlandlameni
 Ngwempisi
 Imiphakatsi: Bhadzeni I, Bhadzeni II, Elushikishini, Emahhashini, Emaqudvulwini, Engcoseni, Enhlulweni, Etshebovu, Khabonina, Mgazini, Velezizweni
 Nhlambeni
 Imiphakatsi: Dwaleni, Kashali, Njelu
 Ntondozi
 Imiphakatsi: Egebeni, Empini, Endlini Lembi, Kandinda, Ncabaneni, Ntondozi

References 

 
Regions of Eswatini